Parade Media (previously known as AMG/Parade and Athlon Media Group) is a publisher founded in 1967 that is based in Nashville, Tennessee.  Nashville's Spencer Hays was its majority stockholder. It was purchased by The Arena Group in 2022 and now operates as a subsidiary of The Arena Group.

Athlon Sports
Athlon is best known for publishing preseason single-title sports annuals on professional and college sports. The annuals are sold at newsstands in the U.S., Canada, Mexico, and Europe. It is the U.S.'s largest publisher of sports annuals, ranking Number 1 in retail sales dollars and magazines sold.

Athlon's 15 sports magazines include Athlon Sports monthly, Pro Football, Fantasy Football, National College Football, Southeastern Football, Atlantic Coast Football, Big Ten Football, Big 12 Football, Big East Football, Pac-10 Football, Baseball, College Basketball, Pro Basketball, Racing and Golf. Athlon's digital properties include AthlonSports.com, which has daily coverage of the sports it covers.

On October 1, 2022, it was announced that Athlon Sports would be discontinuing its special magazines due to its merger with Sports Illustrated. The new special magazines will be released under the Sports Illustrated manner.

History

In February 2006, it acquired Grogans Sports Information Inc., a fantasy sports publisher based in Littleton, Colorado, that publishes Grogans Fantasy Football Analyst in-season scouting reports.

In June 2010, Athlon Sports Communications appointed Anthony Flaccavento publisher for Athlon Sports magazine.  Athlon Sports is a monthly publication that launched in October 2010. Athlon Sports began with a circulation of seven million, and grew to nine million in 2011.

In 2013, Athlon acquired the print rights to three magazines distributed as newspaper inserts: American Profile, Relish, and Spry. Athlon did not acquire the associated websites and later launched the companion website Community Table. In 2014, Athlon acquired Parade from Advance Publications. 

In 2016, Athlon acquired the titles of Harris Publications, which had been shut down.

Athlon Sports as well as Tom James co, an affiliated company have been accused of racism by several employees who complain of an extremely religious, right wing and racist atmosphere.

Publications
AMG Lifestyle
 Flea Market Style
 Harris Farmer's Almanac
 Romantic Country
 Short Hair Style Guide
 Short Styles
 Storage Solutions
AMG/Parade
American Profile's Community Table
 Athlon Sports & Life
 Parade
 Relish
 Spry Living
 TV Times
Athlon Outdoors
 American Frontiersman
 Ballistic
 Combat Handguns
 Guns of the Old West
 Mopar Action
 The New Pioneer
 Survivor's Edge
 Tactical Weapons

References

Sports magazines published in the United States
Publishing companies established in 1967
Companies based in Nashville, Tennessee
1967 establishments in Tennessee
Magazines established in 2010
Magazines published in Tennessee